The Carbon Trust was developed and launched in 1999-2001 as part of the development of the Climate Change Levy (CCL), a tax on business energy use that still operates today. The Carbon Trust was originally funded by around £50m of tax revenue generated from the Levy to help businesses reduce energy costs and therefore offset the additional cost of paying the CCL. The establishment of the Carbon Trust was announced in the 2000 White Paper "Climate Change - the UK Programme" (Cmd 4913). It was launched alongside the introduction of the CCL in March-April 2001.

The Carbon Trust was conceived as a business-led, publicly funded organisation at arms length from the government. The early concept, design and governance were carried out in close consultation with business. Senior officials from the Devolved Administrations and the UK department (the Department of the Environment, Transport and the Regions) would sit on the Trust's Board, where non-business non-executive Directors were in the majority. However the chair, CEO and most of the executive team were appointed from the private sector, most notably the oil and gas and management consultancy sectors.

Remit and initial programmes 
The Trust began its work with three core activities:

 To ensure that UK business and the public sector contribute fully to meeting ongoing targets for greenhouse gas emissions.
 To improve the competitiveness of UK business through resource efficiency; and
 To support the development of a UK industry sector that capitalises on the innovation and commercial value of low carbon technologies nationally and internationally.

The need to recycle CCL revenues back to business by reducing energy costs through energy efficiency was a key early driver of the Carbon Trust's work. Its first act was to take over the government's £17m pa Energy Efficiency Best Practice Programme (EEBPP) in 2002, a UK-wide information-based measure providing independent advice and support on existing energy efficient technologies and energy management practices.

The Trust reconfigured the EEBPP to improve its focus and services to business under a new branding called "Action Energy".

The Carbon Trust also initiated work on new and emerging low carbon technologies using a range of programmes and measures including traditional research, development and demonstration support to supporting early stage companies developing new technologies and practices. These activities came under the banner of the "Low Carbon Innovation Programme"

Current work 
The Carbon Trust presents itself as global organisation, with offices in China, Mexico, the Netherlands, Singapore, South Africa, the UK and USA.

Services

Business advice

The Carbon Trust looks at current and future sustainability challenges and works with business and organisations to develop sustainable strategies to deliver savings.

Carbon footprinting, verification and Carbon Trust standard
The Carbon Trust provides voluntary carbon certification services and carbon labelling schemes – it verifies organisation and product carbon footprint data and provides marks of quality to organisations to demonstrate standards have been met.

Developing clean technology

The Carbon Trust works with governments, innovators and corporates with the aim of accelerating the commercialisation of low carbon technologies, and leads projects to deliver commercial partnerships and develop low carbon technologies. It is particularly active in the areas of offshore wind, marine energy, fuel cell development and industrial energy efficiency.  One such project is the Offshore Wind Accelerator, which is aimed at reducing the cost of wind power through projects focused in the North Sea.  The Offshore Wind Accelerator is a partnership between industry and governments.

Programmes and Innovations

The Carbon Trust provides analysis on sustainability issues to help businesses, investors and policy makers with their roles in reducing carbon and saving energy. It works with companies and governments across the world.

Carbon footprinting, verification and Carbon Trust standard

Carbon Trust standards 

The Carbon Trust runs a series of environmental standards that certify measurement and reduction.  Currently these cover carbon, water and waste and have been awarded to hundreds of leading companies and organisations across the world.

In June 2008 the Carbon Trust introduced the Carbon Trust Carbon Standard to address what it describes as business greenwash. The Carbon Trust Carbon Standard is only awarded to companies and organisations who measure and reduce their carbon emissions year on year. Examples of organisations who have held the Carbon Standard include Sky, Aldi, Eurotunnel, Bupa, PricewaterhouseCoopers, Samsung Electronics, Angus Council, Capital & Regional, O2, npower, Credit Suisse and the Scottish Government.

In February 2013 the Carbon Trust introduced the Carbon Trust Water Standard to recognise those companies reducing their water use year on year.  The first four companies to receive the Water Standard were Sainsbury's, Coca-Cola, Sunlight Services Group and Branston.

In July 2013 the Carbon Trust introduced the Carbon Trust Waste Standard. In November 2013 the waste standard was awarded to the first wave of organisations, which included The Football Association, Renishaw, Whitbread, PricewaterhouseCoopers and AkzoNobel Decorative Paints. These last three became the first in the world to gain the triple crown of reaching the carbon, water and waste standard.

In 2015 the Carbon Trust launched the Carbon Trust Supply Chain Standard to look at carbon footprints across the supply chain. It is the world's first independent certification for organisations that are measuring, managing and reducing greenhouse gas (CO2e) emissions in their supply chains.

Carbon footprint label
The Carbon Trust helps companies to measure the carbon emissions associated with their products (embodied emissions) and also provides a label for these products carbon footprint. Measuring the embodied emissions of products enables reductions to be identified and achieved across the supply chain. The label demonstrates a commitment by the product owner to reduce that footprint every two years. The Carbon Reduction Label was introduced in March 2007.

Examples of products that have featured the carbon footprint label are Amazon Devices, Evian water, Tetra Pak packaging, Kingsmill bread, Quorn foods, Silver Spoon sugar, Walkers crisps, a range of own brand products in Tesco supermarkets, Halifax (HBOS) bank accounts, Dyson airblades, Marshalls building products, Quaker oats, Lafarge cement,  and Pompeian Olive Oil.

The standards behind carbon labelling are now formally recognised through the PAS 2050 developed by the Carbon Trust in conjunction with BSI and Defra.  This methodology is now gaining international acceptance following its launch in October 2008.

However, currently this standard has been revised to the PAS 2050: 2011 version, but the Carbon Trust has not received UKAS accreditation.

References

External links
 Carbon Trust official website
 Low Carbon Workplace
 Green Business Fund
 Introduction to the Carbon Trust, presentation in the California Air Resources Board's Air Pollution Seminar Series.
 The Carbon Trust profile on database of Market Governance Mechanisms

Carbon finance
Department of Energy and Climate Change
Organisations based in the London Borough of Southwark
Private companies limited by guarantee of the United Kingdom